Cherry (originally Cherry Poptart) is an erotic comic book about a sexually adventurous 18-year-old woman and her friends, written and drawn by Larry Welz.

History
First published in 1982 the comic series was originally called Cherry Poptart, but the title was changed to Cherry beginning with Issue #3, explained by Welz as his response to litigation or threats of litigation by Kellogg's over its Pop-Tarts trademark. It has also been suggested that Welz decided that the "Cherry" name alone was better as a brand and looked better as a logo.  Inside the comic Cherry's name was changed to Cherry Popstar, and that name was used in a number of stories, but she was most frequently referred to by just her first name.

The original series has also spawned a spinoff title in 1992 – Cherry's Jubilee – which ran four issues, and featured stories from other writers and artists alongside work by Welz.  In addition, individual issues are collected in a series of Cherry Collections.  Welz has also produced an issue called Cherry Deluxe featuring a story by Neil Gaiman.

The original publisher of the comic was Last Gasp through Issue 13.  Kitchen Sink Press published issues 14–15, as well as reprinting the Last Gasp issues with some modifications (mostly ads).  Beginning with issue 16,  Welz formed Cherry Comics which currently publishes Cherry and related titles.  Again, earlier issues were modified for the new printings, and some bear a "Second Edition" mark.

Though the comic is largely known as an erotic or pornographic book, it does garner critical merit for its humor and  occasional political commentary. The Cherry character has also appeared in several free speech/censorship awareness campaigns. The series is among the largest-selling of the underground comics, and is among those titles credited with reviving that genre.

Contrasting the subject matter with more "innocent" connotations, Welz draws the comic in a simple style reminiscent of Dan DeCarlo, whose style was also the basis for the Archie comic book series,  though he does experiment with different drawing styles, including a 3D edition. The strip so closely followed the "Happy Teenager" genre typified by Archie that lawsuits were threatened, but these failed to stop Welz, who overtly lampooned the Archie characters in the story "Vampironica", though that particular story was pulled from subsequent printings.

Cast

Family 
 Cherry—The main character is a high school student who is described by the comic's publishers as "blonde, cute, sexy, fun, friendly & smart." Her character is bisexual, promiscuous, has small breasts, and can seemingly become sexually aroused simply by breathing. Cherry does not age, but perpetually has "just turned 18".  She was ranked 82nd in Comics Buyer's Guide's "100 Sexiest Women in Comics" list.
 Pepper—Cherry's mother who is a divorced MILF. Pepper is a grown-up version of Cherry, looking very similar and apparently having the same sexual appetites.  She and Cherry co-star in some stories, and Pepper stars alone in others.  In Cherry #14, Cherry's father is revealed to be either George Washington, Davy Crockett, Jesse James, or James Dean, as Pepper had group sex with all of them at the same time.
 Cinnamon—Cherry's little sister. She appeared in one single-page mini-story in issue No 2 in which she was indignant about not being allowed to perform any sex acts in the comic, due to being underage. She is implied to be about 16, since she mentioned she could drive. Welz explained in The Gauntlet in 1992 that the issue and the character were intended to address the serious concern raised by his publisher that if Cherry was depicted as being under 18, the strip could be classified as child pornography.

Boyfriends
 Johnny Fuckerfaster—Cherry's best male friend.
 Ronnie—A boy with a "tuff" car on whom she performed oral sex so she could drive (and subsequently wreck) the car.
 Joey—A sexual partner who helps her with her homework.
 Steve—Cherry's "boyfriend".

Girlfriends
 Ellie Dee—Cherry's best friend, Ellie is tall, slender, and dark-haired, and wears large, round eyeglasses.  A lover of computers and gadgets, Ellie is often drawn into sexual situations through technological accidents.  Occasionally her computer transports her (and sometimes her friends) to 'online' worlds. In issue #8 Ellie is prominently featured in a Dorothy Gale/Oz parody called "Ellie Dee in the Land of Woz". In keeping with her stories' technological themes, her name is a homonym for LED.
 Patty Melt—Another of Cherry's girlfriends, she is short, buxom, and freckled. Patty is as sexually eager as Cherry.
 Lola Palooza—Another of Cherry's girlfriends. A rich, stuck-up character into bondage and domination.

Others
 Captain Eeyow—parody of Captain Eo, the Michael Jackson science fiction character, found in the 3D Issue. In the Eeyow story, Cherry pulls off his pants to find no genitalia of any gender.
 Steve Tyler—Cherry's favorite rock star.
 Mr. Feeney—A teacher Cherry had sex with.

References

External links
 Cherry Comics official online store
 Last Gasp comics
 Larry Welz at Lambiek.net

1982 comics debuts
American comics characters
Bisexuality-related fiction
Comics about women
Comics characters introduced in 1982
Erotic comics
Kitchen Sink Press titles
LGBT characters in comics
LGBT-related comics
Lesbian-related comics
Underground comix